FK Beograd may refer to:

 FK Beograd (Australia), an Australian soccer team
 FK Beograd (Serbia), a defunct Serbian football team

See also
 OFK Beograd, a Serbian professional football team